Wilrey Fontenot, III (born October 14, 1984) is  former American football cornerback. He was drafted by the Atlanta Falcons in the seventh round of the 2008 NFL Draft. He played college football at Arizona.

Fontenot was also a member of the Arizona Cardinals.

Early years
Wilrey started his football as a youth playing in the Humble Area Football League in his home town.

External links
Arizona Cardinals bio
Arizona Wildcats bio

1984 births
Living people
Players of American football from Texas
American football cornerbacks
Arizona Wildcats football players
Atlanta Falcons players
Arizona Cardinals players